Senator Gil J. Puyat Avenue, also known simply as Gil Puyat Avenue and formerly and still referred to as Buendia Avenue, is a major arterial thoroughfare which travels east–west through the cities of Makati and Pasay in western Metro Manila, Philippines. It is one of the busiest avenues in Metro Manila linking the Makati Central Business District with the rest of the metropolis.

The avenue begins at Roxas Boulevard on the west and continues through the district of San Isidro, Pasay until intersecting with Taft Avenue. Past the intersection with the elevated Gil Puyat LRT Station, the road runs through Tramo Street and Barangays Palanan and San Isidro in Makati. East of Osmeña Highway, Gil Puyat intersects with the busy streets of the Makati Central Business District before finally reaching its terminus on Epifanio de los Santos Avenue (EDSA). The avenue also has an extension into Forbes Park in Makati as Buendia Avenue Extension.

Since 1982, this 4- to 12-lane divided avenue takes its name from Gil J. Puyat, a Filipino senator who served from 1951 to 1972. It was originally named Buendia Avenue after Nicolas Buendia, a Katipunero and politician from Bulacan. Part of the avenue from Roxas Boulevard to EDSA is designated as a component of Circumferential Road 3 of the Metro Manila Arterial Road System, while the entire route forms part of National Route 190 (N190) of the Philippine highway network.

It is also part of clearway scheme from Roxas Boulevard in Pasay to Edison Avenue in Makati. The Pasay streets of Leveriza, Harrison Avenue, Donada/A. Luna, Taft Avenue, Sandejas, Dominga/P. Burgos, Tramo Street, and Emilia Street are not allowed to cross the avenue, instead the motorists can use the u-turn slots 100 meters away to reach their destinations. From Edison to Tordesillas, motorists are not allowed to left turn and they need to use u-turn slots. From Nicanor Garcia to Paseo de Roxas, motorists are now allowed to left turn.

Transportation

Gil Puyat Avenue is a major stop on three lines of the Metro Manila Transit System.
 Gil Puyat Station at Taft Avenue served by LRT-1;
 Buendia Station at EDSA served by MRT-3; and
 Buendia railway station along Osmeña Highway served by PNR.
 This station is now closed; the area is now served by the Dela Rosa railway station, one block southwards.

Green Frog Transport Corp. operate hybrid buses serving the route between Gil Puyat and Kalayaan Avenue, as well as the bus transit between Parañaque Integrated Terminal Exchange and Bonifacio Global City. It is also served by provincial buses with terminals along the avenue's section in Pasay, as well as regular and air-conditioned jeepneys.

Intersections and Junctions

Landmarks and neighborhoods

Gil Puyat Avenue travels between the neighborhoods of Leveriza, San Jose, San Isidro, and Santa Clara in Pasay and barangays Palanan, San Isidro, San Antonio, Pio del Pilar, San Lorenzo, Bel-Air, and Urdaneta in Makati. It is the site of some of the tallest buildings in Metro Manila, such as RCBC Plaza on the junction with Ayala Avenue and Petron Megaplaza, the country's tallest building from 1998 to 2000. It also hosts the Pacific Star Building, Grand Soho Makati, The World Centre, One Central Makati, Exportbank Plaza, as well as the headquarters of the Department of Trade and Industry and the Department of Tourism, which recently moved from its previous location in Rizal Park after it was converted into the National Museum of Natural History.

The stretch of Gil Puyat between Makati Avenue and Paseo de Roxas hosts the headquarters of the Metropolitan Bank and Trust Company and Development Bank of the Philippines on Roxas Triangle. Several educational institutions are also located on the avenue such the Makati campuses of Far Eastern University, Centro Escolar University, De La Salle University, and iAcademy; Mapúa University used to have its Makati campus along the avenue. The avenue's other notable landmarks in Makati are the Makati Central Post Office, One Pacific Place, Burgundy Tower, West of Ayala Tower, Teleperformance Center, and SM Cyber Makati.

Gil Puyat Avenue in Pasay is the site of the Manila Adventist College and the Manila Adventist Medical Center. It also hosts the headquarters of the Overseas Workers Welfare Administration, Andres Bonifacio Elementary School, and Net World Plaza. The intersection with Taft Avenue is the location of several provincial bus terminals, including DLTBCo, JAM Liner, JAC Liner, and Green Star Express.

References

Streets in Metro Manila
Makati
Pasay
Makati Central Business District